Ron Francis Blake (born May 23, 1972) is a trumpeter from Los Angeles. He has recorded and performed alongside numerous artists such as Elton John, Aaliyah, Ben Harper, Dr. Dre, and Ziggy Marley. Blake also played with Green Day on their American Idiot tour and appears on the live DVD Bullet in a Bible. He also recorded on their 2016 release Revolution Radio.

Blake studied at Cal State Northridge. As a student, he won the 1992 International Trumpet Guild's Jazz Improvisation competition in Rotterdam. He also won 1st place in the local Dolo Coker Jazz Scholarship and Outstanding Trumpet Player in the Pacific Coast Jazz Festival. Blake went on to study at the California Institute of the Arts on a full scholarship and achieved his master's degree in Music.

Blake runs www.HiSpeedHorns.com , a website allowing artists to get horn arrangements via remote internet sessions. The website was featured in Mix Magazine.

Blake currently plays with Poncho Sanchez and has just released his debut solo Latin jazz album, “Assimilation” in 2017 which featured Poncho Sanchez as a guest. He recently recorded and performed on the 2020 Academy Awards with Elton John for the biopic Rocket Man. The song “I Want To Love Me Again” won a Golden Globe for best song and an Oscar for best song.

Notes

1972 births
American trumpeters
American male trumpeters
Living people
21st-century trumpeters
21st-century American male musicians